Irena Wiśniewska-Santor (born 9 December 1934), known professionally as Irena Santor, is a Polish singer, musical performer and actress.

Her career started in 1950. She's noted for singing in clear mezzo-soprano, considered one of Poland's biggest icons and is referred to as an influence for younger singers. 
From 1951 to 1959 Irena Santor (then Wiśniewska) was a member and the main soloist of the Polish folk group Mazowsze, with whom she toured all continents. After leaving the group she decided to start a solo career. She has been awarded many prizes in Poland and abroad.

Irena Santor made her acting debut in Stanisław Bareja's film Przygoda z piosenką (1968). She appeared in many TV and radio shows and sat on juries for a number of talent shows and song competitions. The singer also recorded soundtracks to Polish and Soviet films.

In 2017, as the first singer in Poland, she was awarded an honorary doctorate for her accomplishments.

In 2021, she announced that she ended her professional career.

Early life and education 
Irena Wiśniewska was born on 9 December 1934 in Papowo Biskupie in northern Poland. She spent her childhood in Solec Kujawski, where her family had moved in the mid-1930s. Her father, Bernard Wiśniewski, was murdered by the German Selbstschutz in the autumn of 1939, a few weeks after the start of World War II. Her mother worked as a seamstress.

After the war Irena's mother's health was failing. In 1948, Irena and her mother lived in Polanica-Zdrój, a health resort in Silesia, where Irena attended the Glass Decoration Gymnasium, and then the Vocational School of Glass Industry, in nearby Szczytna. Teachers discovered her vocal talent and at the end of the 1940s sent her to song competitions.

Career 
In 1950 she met Zdzisław Górzyński, a prominent director of the Grand Theatre, Poznań, who visited Polanica-Zdrój. Górzyński was impressed with her vocal and recommended her to Tadeusz Sygietyński, who was creator and manager of the folk group Mazowsze. He organised casting and accepted Irena's candidacy but stipulated that she will take singing lessons under the direction of opera singer Wanda Wermińska. She agreed. Her mother died that same year, so Irena moved to the Karolin, where she graduated music school and passed the matura exam. Her classmate in this term was actress Lidia Korsakówna.

She was the main soloist in a folk group Mazowsze. With the group she appeared in the first Polish color movie Przygoda na Mariensztacie (1953) and they recorded soundtrack to movie. In the 1950s she traveled around the world with the band. Later on in her life, Irena Santor revealed that she performed for Mao Zedong, which she regrets now. During that time she met her future husband, Stanisław Santor, who was a violinist in Mazowsze. Her most popular song from this period was Ej, przeleciał ptaszek – originally a folk song.

After her marriage to Stanisław Santor, she left the group and started a solo career.

In 2019 she was celebrating the diamond jubilee of her career with a concert tour called "Jubileusz, śpiewam, czyli jestem" ("Jubilee, I sing, therefore I am").

Private life 
In 1958 she married Stanisław Santor. The couple divorced after 19 years, but they remained on good terms until his death in 1999.

Until his death in 2018 her partner was Zbigniew Korpolewski, whom she met in the 1990s.

Discography 

 Rendez-vous z I. Santor (1961)
 W krainie piosenki (1963)
 Dzień dobry piosenko (1964)
 Halo Warszawo (1965)
 Piosenki stare jak świat (1966)
 Powrócisz tu (1967)
 Zapamiętaj, że to ja (1969)
 Wśród nocnej ciszy (1969)
 Dla ciebie śpiewa Irena Santor (1970)
 Moja Warszawa (1972)
 Z tobą na zawsze (1972)
 Witaj gwiazdko złota (1972)
 Jubileusz (1973)
 Irena Santor (1976)
 Baśnie Andersena w piosence (1978)
 Irena Santor (1978)
 Telegram miłości (1979)
 C.D.N. (1982)
 Przeboje pana Stanisława (1982)
 Irena Santor w piosenkach Ryszarda Szeremety (1985)
 Biegnie czas (1990)
 Trzeba marzyć (1992)
 Gdy się Chrystus rodzi (1992)
 Piosenki stare jak świat (1993)
 Warszawa ja i ty (1993)
 Miło wspomnieć (1993)
 Złote przeboje (1994)
 Wiara przenosi góry (1995)
 Duety (1996)
 Tych lat nie odda nikt (1997)
 Baśnie Andersena (1997)
 Przeboje Moniuszki (1998)
 Moje Piosenki (1998–2001) – a series of thirteen records with all previous recordings
 Embarras. Złota Kolekcja (1999)
 Santor Cafe (2000)
 Kolory mojej Warszawy (2CD) (2002)
 Jeszcze (2002)
 Tych lat nie odda nikt. Złota Kolekcja (2004)
 Duety / Santor Cafe (2004)
 Embarras / Tych lat nie odda nikt. Złota Kolekcja 10 lat (2008)
 Urodziny Ireny Santor (2010)
 40 piosenek Ireny Santor, CD1 (2009)
 Kręci mnie ten świat (2010)
 40 piosenek Ireny Santor, CD2 (2011)
 Delicje z Podwieczorków przy mikrofonie, CD1 (2013)
 Delicje z Podwieczorków przy mikrofonie, CD2 (2013)
 Delicje z Podwieczorków przy mikrofonie, CD3 (2013)
 Zamyślenia (2014)
 Punkt widzenia (2014)

Filmography

Awards and honors

Notes

References

External links
Official site.

1934 births
Living people
Polish women singers
Recipients of the Order of Polonia Restituta (1944–1989)
20th-century Polish women
People from Pomeranian Voivodeship (1919–1939)